HMAC-based one-time password (HOTP) is a one-time password (OTP) algorithm based on HMAC. It is a cornerstone of the Initiative for Open Authentication (OATH).

HOTP was published as an informational IETF RFC 4226 in December 2005, documenting the algorithm along with a Java implementation. Since then, the algorithm has been adopted by many companies worldwide (see below). The HOTP algorithm is a freely available open standard.

Algorithm 
The HOTP algorithm provides a method of authentication by symmetric generation of human-readable passwords, or values, each used for only one authentication attempt. The one-time property leads directly from the single use of each counter value.

 A cryptographic hash method H (default is SHA-1)
 A secret key K, which is an arbitrary byte string and must remain private
 A counter C, which counts the number of iterations
 A HOTP value length d (6–10, default is 6, and 6–8 is recommended)

Both parties compute the HOTP value derived from the secret key K and the counter C. Then the authenticator checks its locally generated value against the value supplied by the authenticated.

The authenticator and the authenticated increment the counter C independently of each other, where the latter may increase ahead of the former, thus a resynchronisation protocol is wise.  doesn't actually require any such, but does make a recommendation. This simply has the authenticator repeatedly try verification ahead of their counter through a window of size s. The authenticator's counter continues forward of the value at which verification succeeds and requires no actions by the authenticated.

The recommendation is made that persistent throttling of HOTP value verification take place, to address their relatively small size and thus vulnerability to brute-force attacks. It is suggested that verification be locked out after a small number of failed attempts or that each failed attempt attracts an additional (linearly increasing) delay.

6-digit codes are commonly provided by proprietary hardware tokens from a number of vendors informing the default value of d. Truncation extracts 31 bits or  decimal digits, meaning that d can be at most 10, with the 10th digit adding less variation, taking values of 0, 1, and 2 (i.e., 0.3 digits).

After verification, the authenticator can authenticate itself simply by generating the next HOTP value, returning it, and then the authenticated can generate their own HOTP value to verify it. Note that counters are guaranteed to be synchronised at this point in the process.

The HOTP value is the human-readable design output, a d-digit decimal number (without omission of leading 0s):

 HOTP value = HOTP(K, C) mod 10d.

That is, the value is the d least significant base-10 digits of HOTP.

HOTP is a truncation of the HMAC of the counter C (under the key K and hash function H):

 HOTP(K, C) = truncate(HMAC(K, C)),

where the counter C must be used big-endian.

Truncation first takes the 4 least significant bits of the MAC and uses them as a byte offset i:

 truncate(MAC) = extract31(MAC, MAC[(19 × 8 + 4):(19 × 8 + 7)]),

where ":" is used to extract bits from a starting bit number up to and including an ending bit number, where these bit numbers are 0-origin. The use of "19" in the above formula relates to the size of the output from the hash function.

That index i is used to select 31 bits from MAC, starting at bit i × 8 + 1:

 extract31(MAC, i) = MAC[(i × 8 + 1):(i × 8 + 4 × 8 − 1)].

31 bits are a single bit short of a 4-byte word. Thus the value can be placed inside such a word without using the sign bit (the most significant bit). This is done to definitely avoid doing modular arithmetic on negative numbers, as this has many differing definitions and implementations.

Tokens 
Both hardware and software tokens are available from various vendors, for some of them see references below. Hardware tokens implementing OATH HOTP tend to be significantly cheaper than their competitors based on proprietary algorithms. As of 2010, OATH HOTP hardware tokens can be purchased for a marginal price. Some products can be used for strong passwords as well as OATH HOTP.

Software tokens are available for (nearly) all major mobile/smartphone platforms (J2ME, Android, iPhone, BlackBerry, Maemo, macOS, and Windows Mobile).

Reception 

Although the reception from some of the computer press has been negative during 2004 and 2005, after IETF adopted HOTP as RFC 4226 in December 2005, various vendors started to produce HOTP-compatible tokens and/or whole authentication solutions.

According to the article "Road Map: Replacing Passwords with OTP Authentication" on strong authentication, published by Burton Group (a division of Gartner, Inc.) in 2010, "Gartner's expectation is that the hardware OTP form factor will continue to enjoy modest growth while smartphone OTPs will grow and become the default hardware platform over time."

See also 
 Initiative for Open Authentication
 S/KEY
 Time-based one-time password algorithm (TOTP)

References

External links 
 RFC 4226: HOTP: An HMAC-Based One-Time Password Algorithm
 RFC 6238: TOTP: Time-Based One-Time Password Algorithm
 RFC 6287: OCRA: OATH Challenge-Response Algorithm
 Initiative For Open Authentication
 Implementation of RFC 4226 - HOPT Algorithm Step by step Python implementation in a Jupyter Notebook

Internet protocols
Cryptographic algorithms
Computer access control protocols